Sino-Korean may refer to:
 Sino-Korean vocabulary, Korean vocabulary composed of morphemes of Chinese origin
 People's Republic of China–North Korea relations
 People's Republic of China–South Korea relations
 Republic of China–South Korea relations
 Chinese people in Korea (also known Hwagyo)
 Koreans in China (also known as Joseonjok or Chaoxianzu)
 Sino–Korean cuisine, a hybrid cuisine developed by Chinese and Koreans

See also
Chinese-language literature of Korea
Chinese influence on Korean culture